The Isle of Man football league system comprises two connected leagues for football clubs in the Isle of Man, the Premier League and Division Two. The system has a hierarchical format with promotion and relegation between the two leagues. There are currently 25 clubs who are members of a league in the Isle of Man men's football league system, split into two divisions, one of 12 clubs and one of 13 clubs.

The league system for women's football in Isle of Man runs separately. There is currently only one league comprising six clubs.

Cup eligibility 
Being members of a league at a particular level affects eligibility for Cup, or single-elimination, competitions.
 Isle of Man FA Cup: Levels 1 and 2
 Isle of Man Hospital Cup: Levels 1 and 2
 Isle of Man Railway Cup: Level 1 only
 Paul Henry Gold Cup: Level 2 only
 Captain George Woods Memorial Cup: Level 2 only

The system

Women's system 
The women's system currently has one step. The league comprises six clubs and there is no promotion or relegation.

See also 
 League system, for a list of similar systems in other countries
 Football in the Isle of Man
 Isle of Man Football Association
 Isle of Man Football League

References 

Football in the Isle of Man